This is a list of the final 15-man squads named for the 1999 Cricket World Cup in England which took place from 14 May 1999 to 20 June 1999, in accordance to the jersey number worn. Each team had to number the players from 1 to 15 and usually captains wore the no.1 jersey. The oldest player at the 1999 Cricket World Cup was Ian Philip (40/41) of Scotland while the youngest player was Mohammad Sheikh (18) of Kenya.

Australia
Coach:  Geoff Marsh

Bangladesh
Coach: Gordon Greenidge

England
Coach:  David Lloyd

India
Coach:   Anshuman Gaekwad

Kenya

New Zealand
Coach:  Steve Rixon

Pakistan
Coach:  Richard Pybus

Scotland

South Africa
Coach:  Bob Woolmer
Makhaya Ntini was named in the original squad, but was replaced on 23 April 1999 by Alan Dawson following a conviction for a serious criminal offence. The conviction was later overturned.
Hansie Cronje was the only captain not to wear the No.1 jersey in the tournament.

Sri Lanka
Coach: Roy Dias

West Indies
Coach:  Malcolm Marshall

Carl Hooper was named in the original squad, but was replaced on 27 April 1999 by Ricardo Powell following his retirement from international cricket.

Zimbabwe

References

External links
 1999 World Cup squads. Cricinfo.com.

Cricket World Cup squads
1999 Cricket World Cup